Christian Frei (born 1959 in Schönenwerd, Solothurn) is a Swiss filmmaker and film producer. He is mostly known for his films War Photographer (2001), The Giant Buddhas (2005) and Space Tourists (2009).

Frei has been an associate lecturer on Reflection Competence at the renowned University of St. Gallen since 2006. From 2006 to 2009 he was president of the “Documentary Film Commission” for the film section of the Swiss Federal Office of Culture, and since August 2010 he has held the position of President of the Swiss Film Academy.

Career
He follows his protagonists closely - always in search of authentic moments, and always keeping the whole picture in mind. Peter-Matthias Gaede said that Frei made films that avoided "noise, pompous gestures, the rush of speed" and that he and his cameraman (Peter Indergand) made films that were subtle and "exude quiet persistance". According to Kulturzeit, "What makes these films so extraordinary? They are authentic moments that endure. Christian Frei takes us along a perimeter that both divides and unites individuals and cultures: the tectonics of humanity."

Frei studied television at the Department of Journalism and Communications of the University of Fribourg. In 1981 he directed his first documentary short film, Die Stellvertreterin. After co-directing Fortfahren with Ivo Kummer in 1984, he became an independent filmmaker and producer. He made another short film, Der Radwechsel. Then he moved on to feature-length documentaries with Ricardo, Miriam y Fidel (1997). The documentary was described as being "surprisingly revealing" by the Chicago Tribune, who went on to say that the "pain and disillusionment on both sides are in plain view". It portrays the rift between Miriam Martinez, who wants to leave Cuba for the USA, and her father Ricardo Martinez - one of the founders of Fidel Castro's "Radio Rebelde". The Chicago Tribune goes on to say that the film "is equally sympathetic to Ricardo's revolutionary hopes and Miriam's hopelessness -- an amazing feat in a Cuban film."

War Photographer (2001) marks a turning point in his career as director in 2001: Due to the Academy Award nomination for Best Documentary and numerous prizes worldwide he had the international break through. For this feature-length documentary, Frei spent two years accompanying war photographer James Nachtwey to different war zones around the world. The film shows his protagonist to be a shy and reserved man, far from the hothead image associated with his profession. Frei intelligently plays with the role of the spectator, confronting him with the ambivalence of war photography and the role of the media. The documentary appeals to the spectators’ sense for compassion and thematically approaches the theme of war itself.  Still popular with audiences and critics today, the film has become a classic.

With The Giant Buddhas (2005), Frei once again deals with a subject of strong political and global interest: The film revolves around the destruction of the two giant Buddhas of Bamiyan in Afghanistan’s remote Bamiyan Valley. It is an essay "on faith and fanaticism, tolerance and terrorism, identity and ignorance, the ephemeral and our feeble attempts to preserve it". The film turned out to be a documentary that filled a necessary gap of knowledge far from the everyday media war reportage.

At the Sundance Film Festival in 2010 Frei won the “World Cinema Directing Award” for his film Space Tourists (2009). The documentary juxtaposes the journeys of the extremely rich tourists traveling with the astronauts into space with the poor Kazakh metal collectors risking their lives in search for rocket waste fallen down into the planes once the space shuttle has left. As a result, the film turns out to be a humorous and poetic declaration of love for planet earth. Critics acclaimed this film for its breathtaking imagery and richness of insights, having strengthened Frei’s reputation as one of today’s most original and innovative directors.

In 2014, Sleepless in New York premiered in competition at Visions du Réel, the Nyon International Documentary Film Festival. Frei dives into the frenzied nights of three newly rejected. Helen Fisher, an American biological anthropologist, reveals the astounding and profound processes that unfold in the brain of the lovesick. Working again with DOP Peter Indergand, they developed a spherical mirror to capture the solitude of the broken-hearted.

As producer, Christian Frei releases Raving Iran, the first feature length documentary directed by Susanne Regina Meures. She follows two Tehran DJs performing on illegal parties and planning to leave Iran. The film had its international premiere at the Hot Docs Canadian International Documentary Festival Toronto and won awards at numerous film festivals.

The documentary Genesis 2.0 celebrated its world premiere at the Sundance Film Festival in January 2018 and was awarded with the World Cinema Documentary Special Jury Award for Cinematography. Swiss cameraman Peter Intergand and the Russian filmmaker Maxim Arbugaev are responsible for the cinematography, Arbugaev also co-directed the film. Genesis 2.0 follows mammoth hunters on the remote New Siberian Islands and portrays clone researchers and  synthetic biologists in South Korea, China and USA.

Filmography
 Die Stellvertreterin (1981)
 Fortfahren (1982)
 Der Radwechsel (1984)
 Ricardo, Miriam y Fidel (1997)
 Kluge Köpfe (1998)
 Bollywood im Alpenrausch – Indische Filmemacher erobern die Schweiz (2000)
 War Photographer (2001)
 The Giant Buddhas (2005)
 Space Tourists (2009)
 Sleepless in New York (2014)
 Genesis 2.0 (2018), co-directed by Maxim Arbugaev

Awards

Ricardo, Miriam y Fidel
 Basic Trust International Human Rights Film Festival Ramallah-Tel Aviv 2000: audience award

War Photographer
 Academy Awards 2002: Nominated Best Documentary Feature
 Gregory Foster Peabody Award 2003
 Emmy 2004: Nomination Award for Cinematographer Peter Indergand
 Adolf Grimme Award 2003: Special Prize of the Ministry for Development, Culture and Sports
 Durban International Film Festival 2002: Best documentary
 Cologne Conference 2002: Winner Phoenix Price Best non-fiction
 Rehoboth Beach, Delaware Independent Film Festival 2002: audience award
 Viewpoint film festival Gent 2002: winner
 European Documentary Film Festival Oslo 2003: Eurodok award
 Dokufest, Pizren Dokumentary and Short Film Festival 2003: winner
 British Documentary Awards 2002: Shortlisted The Grierson Award Category International Documentary
 Swiss Film Award 2002: Nominated Best Documentary Film
 Docaviv Tel Aviv International Documentary Film Festival: winner
 Sichuan Television Festival: Gold Panda Award Best Long Documentary
 Telluride Mountainfilm, Mountain Film Festival Telluride (Colorado) 2003: Voice of Humanity Award

The Giant Buddhas
 DOK Leipzig 2005: Silver Dove
 Dokufest, Pizren Dokumentary and Short Film Festival 2006: winner ex aequo
 Trento Film Festival 2006: Silver Gentian
 Reno Tahoe International Film Festival 2006: Best of the Fest – Documentary
 Sundance Film Festival 2006: Nominated Grand Jury Prize feature-length documentaries
 Swiss Film Award 2006: Nominated Best Documentary Film

Space Tourists
 The Documentary Channel 2012: Jury prize "Best of Doc"
 Cervino Cine Mountain International Mountain Film Festival 2011: Miglior Grand Prix dei Festival 2011
 Beldocs Belgrad 2010: Best Photography Award
 Berg- und Abenteuerfilmfestival Graz 2010: Grand Prix Documentary Feature
 European Documentary Film Festival Oslo 2010: Eurodok Award
 Sundance Film Festival 2010: World Cinema Directing Award
 EBS International Documentary Festival Seoul 2010: Special jury prize
 Swiss Film Award 2010: Nominated Best Documentary

Genesis 2.0
 Sundance Film Festival 2018: World Cinema Documentary Special Jury Award for Cinematography to Maxim Arbugaev und Peter Indergand
 40th Moscow International Film Festival 2018: Audience Award
 15th Seoul Eco Film Festival 2018: Best Feature Film
 Lunenburg Doc Fest 2018: Feature Documentary Award
 International Arctic Film Festival Golden Raven 2018: Golden Raven Award
 9th DocUtah International Film Festival 2018: Best Foreign Film
 Zürcher Filmpreis 2018: Film Award City of Zurich
 Budapest International Documentary Film Festival 2019: Main Prize section Naked Truth
 Swiss Film Award 2019: Nomination Best Documentary Film

References

Further reading
 The Tectonics of Humanity. GEO Edition Documentaries Christian Frei Collection, ed. by Warner Home Video Switzerland 2007.

External links
 Norbert Creutz: Director’s Portrait Christian Frei, ed. by SwissFilms May 2006

1959 births
Living people
German-language film directors
Swiss film directors
Swiss film producers
University of Fribourg alumni
Swiss documentary filmmakers